John Fullerton may refer to:
John Fullerton, Lord Fullerton (1775–1853), Scottish law lord
Sir John Fullerton (Royal Navy officer) (1840–1918), British Royal Navy officer and courtier
John Fullerton (politician) (1912–1965), politician in Ontario, Canada
John B. Fullerton, American financier